KRT71 is a keratin gene. Keratins are intermediate filament proteins responsible for the structural integrity of epithelial cells and are
subdivided into epithelial keratins and hair keratins. This gene encodes a protein that is expressed in the inner
root sheath of hair follicles. The type II keratins are clustered in a region of chromosome 12q13.(provided by
RefSeq, Jun 2009)